On November 29, 2012, a bomb placed at the back door of the Casa Grande, Arizona, U.S. Social Security Administration office shook the city's downtown but failed to breach the building. An Iraqi-born convicted felon, Abdullatif Ali Aldosary, 47, was charged. Evidence collected at his home shows he researched "terrorist bombs" and amassed appropriate materials. Aldosary, allowed entry as a refugee, was denied a green card based on his "terrorism-related activities" as an insurgent fighting Saddam Hussein in 1991. No motive has been suggested by authorities. Aldosary was also charged with an unrelated murder that occurred two days before the bombing.

References

Explosions in 2012
November 2012 crimes in the United States
Terrorist incidents in the United States in 2012
Casa Grande, Arizona
2012 in Arizona
Building bombings in the United States